Kathleen Elizabeth Hilton ( Avanzino; formerly Richards; born March 13, 1959) is an American socialite, fashion designer, actress, and television personality. She is the mother of socialite Paris Hilton and fashion designer Nicky Hilton and the half sister of The Real Housewives of Beverly Hills stars Kim Richards and Kyle Richards. Since 2021, Hilton has also starred on that series.

Early life 
Hilton is the daughter of Kathleen Mary (née Dugan) and Larry Avanzino. Her father's family comes from Italian ancestry while her mother's side comes from Ireland. Hilton's parents later divorced, and her mother married Kenneth E. Richards (1917–1998), who already had three grown children from a previous marriage, and had Hilton's two maternal half-sisters: actresses Kim and Kyle Richards. Hilton also has five paternal half-siblings from her father's remarriage. She graduated from Montclair College Preparatory School in Los Angeles, where she became best friends with Michael Jackson. They remained close friends until his death in 2009.

Television and film career 
In 1968, Hilton began working as a child actress, retiring in 1979. Notable appearances include Nanny and the Professor, Bewitched, Family Affair, Happy Days, The Rockford Files, and film appearances include The Dark and On the Air Live with Captain Midnight. On the May 13, 2008, episode of The Young and the Restless, she made a cameo appearance as herself.

In 2005, she hosted the reality show, I Want To Be a Hilton on NBC. She also appeared on The World According to Paris in 2011.

In June 2012, Hilton commented that she refuses to watch her half-sisters Kim and Kyle Richards on The Real Housewives of Beverly Hills, stating they caused her to "break down in tears" over watching their lives "fall apart". In October 2020, it was revealed that Hilton would appear as a friend of the housewives for the eleventh season of the show. Her addition to the show was well received by the public and she soon became a fan favorite. In June 2021, People called her "already a Real Housewives of Beverly Hills legend", writing: "Bravo's only mistake in casting Kathy Hilton on the show is that they didn't do it sooner."

Business ventures 
In the 1980s and early 1990s, Hilton operated her own gift and antiques store The Staircase on Sunset Plaza in Los Angeles. She debuted with 2002 merchandise sales on cable TV's QVC home shopping network. In 2007, she began selling a signature skincare line on HSN. Hilton launched a perfume called "My Secret" in 2008.

Since 2012, she has designed the Kathy Hilton Collection of party dresses, sold in four hundred stores worldwide, including Neiman Marcus, Saks Fifth Avenue and Nordstrom. In December 2020, Hilton and her daughters Paris and Nicky, modeled new Valentino 2021 resort collection in a photo series for Vogue.

Philanthropy 

Hilton raised money for the Make-A-Wish Foundation in 2007, by asking celebrities to auction some of their belongings and donating the proceeds to them. In 2011, alongside her two daughters, she received an award from the Starlight Children's Foundation at its  'A Stellar Night' Gala in Century City, Los Angeles.

Personal life
Hilton married Richard Hilton on November 24, 1979 when she was 20 years old. They have four children: Paris Hilton (born 1981), Nicky Hilton (born 1983), Barron Nicholas Hilton II (born 1989) and Conrad Hughes Hilton III (born 1994). Hilton has six grandchildren, three by Nicky  two by Barron, and one by Paris.

The couple resides in Bel Air, Los Angeles.

Filmography

References

External links
 

Living people
1959 births
20th-century American actresses
20th-century American businesswomen
20th-century American businesspeople
21st-century American actresses
21st-century American businesswomen
21st-century American businesspeople
Actors from Whittier, California
Actresses from Los Angeles
American fashion businesspeople
American film actresses
American people of Irish descent
American people of Italian descent
American socialites
American television actresses
Businesspeople from Los Angeles
Conrad Hilton family
Montclair College Preparatory School alumni
Participants in American reality television series
People from Bel Air, Los Angeles
Philanthropists from California
Richards family